Wattyl is a brand of architectural, decorative paints, special purpose and protective coatings sold throughout Australia and New Zealand. As of February 2021, it is fully owned by the Hempel Group.

The company is the second largest brand in Australia for architectural and decorative paints after market leader Dulux.

Wattyl was listed on the Australian Stock Exchange (ASX) from 1959, until it was delisted on 22 September 2010 when all the Company's shares were acquired by Valspar.

As of 25 May 2010 Wattyl employed over 1500 people in Australia and New Zealand.

Wattyl was the first Australian manufacturer of two pot polyurethanes for the DIY market and a very successful marketing campaign during the 1960s and 1970s led to the brand name Estapol becoming the Australian term for the DIY clear finishing of domestic timber surfaces with one or two pot polyurethane finishes.

The Wattyl range of products include the brands Granosite, Solagard, Estapol and Killrust.

Wattyl is the current main sponsor of the Lake Taupo Cycle Challenge event in New Zealand.

References

External links

 http://www.theage.com.au/articles/2004/06/28/1088392599614.html?from=storylhs
 http://www.asx.com.au/asx/research/delistedCompanies.do

Manufacturing companies of New Zealand
Companies formerly listed on the Australian Securities Exchange
Australian subsidiaries of foreign companies
Paint and coatings companies of Australia